Huang Hsiu-meng  (born 1944) is a Taiwanese politician and educator.

Huang was born in 1944. She attended National Taiwan Normal University and later earned certification from National Kaohsiung Normal University and the Institute of Revolutionary Practice. Huang became a middle school teacher. She has chaired the Taiwan Education Association and served on the board of Kuang Wu Institute of Technology. Huang was a member of the Taiwan Provincial Assembly from its seventh through ninth convocations, between 1981 and 1994. She was elected to the Legislative Yuan in 1995 and 1998, representing Tainan County as a member of the Kuomintang. Huang had also served on the Kuomintang's Central Committee.

References

1944 births
Living people
Tainan Members of the Legislative Yuan
Members of the 3rd Legislative Yuan
Members of the 4th Legislative Yuan
20th-century Taiwanese educators
Kuomintang Members of the Legislative Yuan in Taiwan
21st-century Taiwanese women politicians
National Taiwan Normal University alumni
Taiwanese schoolteachers
20th-century women educators
20th-century Taiwanese women politicians